Edward Tyng (1683–1755) was a British naval officer who was captain of the batteries and fortifications of Boston and in command of the first Massachusetts man-of-war Prince of Orange (ship) (1740). He was the son-in-law of Cyprian Southack.

He was the son of Edward Tyng, who, during King William's War, was the commander of Fort Loyal, Fort William Henry and later became Governor of Acadia, only to be taken prisoner in the Naval battle off St. John (1691).

During King George's War he broke the Mi'kmaq militia, French and Acadian sieges of Annapolis Royal in 1744 and again the following year (1745).  As commodore of the fleet, Tyng led 13 armed vessels and about 90 transports in the successful Siege of Louisbourg (1745).  He participated in the Capture of the Vigilant and the destruction of Port Dauphin (Englishtown, Nova Scotia) in June 1745.

His son was Col William Tyng who was a soldier in the British army.

Gallery

References

Sources
Canadian Biography - Edward Tyng
Memoirs of Edward Tyng, Esquire ... and of Hon. William Tyng ... By Edward Tyng, William Tyng, Timothy Alden
 The Province Snow, "Prince of Orange." (1901)

Military history of Nova Scotia
1683 births
1755 deaths
Royal Navy officers
King William's War